Weipa Airport is a rural locality in the Weipa Town, Queensland, Australia. In the  Weipa Airport had a population of 0 people.

Geography
The land is used for the airport runways and associated buildings and not for any other purposes. There remains some undeveloped land. This locality is disconnected from the other localities of Weipa Town and is entirely surrounded by the locality of Mission River in the Shire of Cook.

History 
As the name suggests, the locality contains the Weipa Airport.

References 

Weipa Town
Localities in Queensland